Hademstorf is a municipality in the district of Heidekreis, in Lower Saxony, Germany.

References

Heidekreis